Andrea Longo (born 16 November 1971) is a retired Italian Nordic combined skier. He competed at the 1994 and 1998 Winter Olympics and placed in 44th and 22nd.

References

1971 births
Living people
Nordic combined skiers at the 1994 Winter Olympics
Nordic combined skiers at the 1998 Winter Olympics
Olympic Nordic combined skiers of Italy
Italian male Nordic combined skiers